In Session is a compilation album containing Lisa Stansfield's early recordings from 1981 to 1983. It was released by Sovereign Music on 20 September 1996.

Content 
The album contains fourteen songs written by David Pickerill and Paul O'Donoughue, and produced by Pickerill, including Stansfield's first three singles: "Your Alibis" (retitled here as "Alibi's"), "The Only Way" and "Listen to Your Heart", and their B-sides: "The Thought Police" and "Only Love", retitled "Only Love (Can Break Your Heart)". In Session does not include Stansfield's fourth single "I Got a Feeling", but includes its B-side "Red Lights" (track 10).

Track listing

Release history

References

1996 albums
Lisa Stansfield compilation albums